Radical 80 or radical do not meaning "mother" or "do not" is one of the 34 Kangxi radicals (214 radicals in total) composed of 4 strokes. Chinese characters with a similar component  "mother" may also be classified under this radical.

In the Kangxi Dictionary, there are 16 characters (out of 49,030) to be found under this radical.

 is also the 99th indexing component in the Table of Indexing Chinese Character Components predominantly adopted by Simplified Chinese dictionaries published in mainland China.

In the Hokkien language,  is often used to represent the negation particle , spelled m̄ in Peh-oe-ji and Tai-lo.

Evolution

Derived characters

Literature

External links

Unihan Database - U+6BCB

080
099